Nemmersdorf may refer to:

Places 
 former German name of the settlement Mayakovskoye, today Kaliningrad Oblast, Russia
 part of Goldkronach, a town in the district of Bayreuth, Germany

People 
 "Franz von Nemmersdorf", pen name of Franziska von Reitzenstein (1834–1896), German novelist

Events 
 Nemmersdorf massacre